In mathematics, Stickelberger's theorem is a result of algebraic number theory, which gives some information about the Galois module structure of class groups of cyclotomic fields. A special case was first proven by Ernst Kummer (1847) while the general result is due to Ludwig Stickelberger (1890).

The Stickelberger element and the Stickelberger ideal
The Stickelberger element (of level  or of ) is an element in the group ring  and the Stickelberger ideal (of level  or of ) is an ideal in the group ring . They are defined as follows. Let  denote a primitive th root of unity.
.
The Stickelberger element of level  is defined as

This not true for general F.

Examples
If  is a totally real field of conductor , then

Statement of the theorem
Stickelberger's Theorem
Let  be an abelian number field.

Explicitly, the theorem is saying that if  is such that

is a principal ideal.

See also 

Gross–Koblitz formula
Herbrand–Ribet theorem
Thaine's theorem
Jacobi sum
Gauss sum

Notes

References 
 
Boas Erez, Darstellungen von Gruppen in der Algebraischen Zahlentheorie: eine Einführung

External links 
PlanetMath page

Cyclotomic fields
Theorems in algebraic number theory